IATEUR (Institut d'aménagement des territoires, d'environnement et d'urbanisme de l'université de Reims) (Regional Planning, Environment and Urban Development Institute of the University of Reims) is a teaching and research unit of the University of Reims. It was founded in 1971 by Roger Brunet, then a professor of geography. IATEUR combines three major foci: planning, development and environment in order to provide a framework for sustainable urbanisation and heritage preservation.

References

Research institutes in France